The 1917 Hong Kong Sanitary Board election was supposed to be held on 30 March 1917 for an elected seat in the Sanitary Board of Hong Kong.

The election was held for the two of the elected seats in the board due to the resignation of P. W. Goldring who resigned early in the month. C. G. Alabaster, nominated by Henry Pollock and Montague Ede was elected unopposed.

References

Hong Kong
1917 in Hong Kong
Sanitary
Uncontested elections
March 1917 events
1917 elections in the British Empire